Jasień may refer to:
Jasień, Kuyavian-Pomeranian Voivodeship (north-central Poland)
Jasień, Lubusz Voivodeship (west Poland)
Jasień, Pomeranian Voivodeship (north Poland)
Jasień, Brzeziny County in Łódź Voivodeship (central Poland)
Jasień, Radomsko County in Łódź Voivodeship (central Poland)
Jasień, Skierniewice County in Łódź Voivodeship (central Poland)
Jasień, Tomaszów Mazowiecki County in Łódź Voivodeship (central Poland)
Jasień, Wieluń County in Łódź Voivodeship (central Poland)
Jasień, Lesser Poland Voivodeship (south Poland)
Jasień, Gmina Chmielnik in Świętokrzyskie Voivodeship (south-central Poland)
Jasień, Gmina Łopuszno in Świętokrzyskie Voivodeship (south-central Poland)
Jasień, Staszów County in Świętokrzyskie Voivodeship (south-central Poland)
Jasień, Masovian Voivodeship (east-central Poland)
Jasień, Greater Poland Voivodeship (west-central Poland)
Jasień (river), a river in the Polish city Łódź

See also
Gmina Jasień, urban-rural gmina in Żary County, Lubusz Voivodeship (western Poland)
Nowy Jasień, village in  Tomaszów Mazowiecki County, Łódź Voivodeship (central Poland)
Jasienna
Jaÿsinia